Sheldon Mallory (born July 16, 1953) is an American former Major League Baseball outfielder.

He was traded to the New York Mets in December 1976, and was purchased from them by the Athletics the following April. After his lone major league season, he spent one season each in the Toronto Blue Jays and Cleveland Indians organizations before retiring.

References

External links

Major League Baseball outfielders
Oakland Athletics players
Billings Mustangs players
Waterloo Royals players
San Jose Bees players
Jacksonville Suns players
Omaha Royals players
San Jose Missions players
Syracuse Chiefs players
Tacoma Tugs players
Baseball players from Illinois
1953 births
Living people
People from Summit, Illinois